Rajabu Willer (born 19 February 1991 in Allerød), better known as ; stylized KAKA), is a Danish reggae, dancehall and hip hop artist of Tanzanian descent. At various times, he was known as Little Kaka, Lil' Kaka and Bigg Kaka before dropping the adjectives.

In 2007, Kaka had his debut appearing on stage with Natasja Saad on her last shows in Copenhagen before she died in Jamaica. Kaka later collaborated with Lyrical D'Mirical and his sound system Splif Click also being part of the Danish reggae underground scene with Youngblood Sound. In 2009, he allied himself with the producers Pharfar and Fresh-I and their sound system Donkey Sound. In 2011, he was featured in Wafande's debut single "Gi' mig et smil" (meaning Give Me a Smile). Kaka had his own first release in collaboration with Donkey Sound in the track "Mere Energi". However, his biggest success came with "Bang Bang (Reggaejam)" on the newly formed label Donkey Recs (founded by Donkey Sound, producer duo Pharfar and Fresh-I and Musicall Management). The song charted in the Tracklisten, official Danish Singles Chart in 2012. He followed that up with the single "En sidste sang" in 2013, also a Top 20 hit in Denmark.

Discography

EPs

Singles

Others / Videos
2011: "Mere Energi"
2011: "Hurtigere end dem"
2012: "Dansk Dancehall"
2013: "Ingen knive når vi fester"
2013: "En sidste sang"
2014: "Småproblemer"

Featured in
2011: "Gi' mig et smil" (Wafande feat. Kaka)
2012: "Ganja baby" (Cornstick & Kaka)
2012: "P6 BAS Dancehall Anthem" (Sukkerlyn, Raske Penge, Kaka, Pato, TopGunn, Klumben) (free single)

References

1991 births
Living people
People from Allerød Municipality
Danish musicians
Danish people of Tanzanian descent
21st-century Danish musicians